Mayrhof is a municipality in the district of Schärding in the Austrian state of Upper Austria.

Geography
Mayrhof lies in the Innviertel. About 9 percent of the municipality is forest, and 82 percent is farmland.

References

Cities and towns in Schärding District